Thomas Benjamin Banks  (December 17, 1936 – January 25, 2018) was a Canadian pianist, conductor, arranger, composer, television personality and senator.

Television and musical career
Banks was the host of nationally - and internationally - syndicated and network television programs, including “The Tommy Banks Show” (1968-1983), “Somewhere There’s Music”, “What’s My Name”, “ Love and Mr. Smith”, “Celebrity Revue”, “Symphony of a Thousand”, “Tommy Banks Jazz”, etc.

He provided musical direction for the ceremonies of the XI Commonwealth Games, EXPO ’86, the World University Games, the XV Olympic Winter Games, and for countless television shows.  He produced and/or conducted command performances for Her Majesty the Queen and the Royal Family, and for President Ronald Reagan.
He was a member of the A. F. of M., ACTRA, the National Academy of Recording Arts & Sciences (U.S.), the Canadian Academy of Recording Arts & Sciences, and of the Academy of Canadian Cinema & Television.
Banks made his jazz-playing debut in 1950 in the touring band of saxophonist Don (D. T.) Thompson.  He played jazz throughout North America, Western and Central Europe, Japan, and Southeast Asia.
In 1983 his quintet became the first jazz band to tour in continental China since the 1949 revolution.

Before being called to the Senate of Canada, Tommy Banks served as chair of the Music Committee of the Board of Governors of Alberta College; he was founding chairman of the Alberta Foundation for the Performing Arts;  chair of the Music Program at Grant MacEwan Community College; of the Edmonton Concert Hall Foundation; of the Instrumental Jazz Division of MusicFest Canada (North America’s largest music festival organization); of the B. & B. Foundation for the Theatrical & Musical Arts of Alberta; member of the board of the CKUA Radio Network Foundation; Honorary chair of the Alberta Heart Fund; an Honorary member of Cosmopolitan International and of Rotary International (of which he was a Paul Harris Fellow).

On Century II Records, distributed by Royalty Records.

** JUNO Award winner       * JUNO Award nominee

Guest conducted 
 Budapest Symphony Orchestra of the Hungarian State Radio & Television
 Calgary Philharmonic Orchestra
 Chattanooga Symphony Orchestra
 Edmonton Symphony Orchestra
 Hamilton Philharmonic Orchestra
 Kitchener-Waterloo Symphony Orchestra
 Lethbridge Symphony Orchestra
 Memphis Symphony Orchestra
 National Arts Centre Orchestra
 Regina Symphony Orchestra
 Saskatoon Symphony Orchestra
 Southwest Florida Symphony Orchestra
 Toledo Symphony Orchestra
 The Toronto Symphony
 Vancouver Symphony Orchestra
 Symphony Nova-Scotia
 Winnipeg Symphony Orchestra

Government career
Senator Banks was appointed to the Senate by Governor General Adrienne Clarkson at the recommendation of Prime Minister Jean Chrétien in 2000. He represented Alberta, sitting as a Liberal. In the Senate, he served as a member of the Standing Committee on National Finance, of the Special Committee on Illegal Drugs, of the Standing Committee on National Security and Defence (SCONSAD) and on its steering committee, and as chair of the Subcommittee on Veterans’ Affairs. In each of the 37th, 38th, and 39th Parliaments he was elected Chair of the Standing Committee on Energy, the Environment, and Natural Resources. In the 37th and 38th Parliaments he served as Chair of the Alberta Liberal Parliamentary Caucus. Following dissolution of the 37th Parliament Senator Banks was named to an all-party Committee of Parliamentarians from both Houses, given the task of advising the Government on the setting up of parliamentary oversight of security intelligence matters. He served on an ad hoc basis on several additional committees of the Senate.  He was vice-chair of the Caucus task force on urban issues that produced Canada's Urban Strategy - a Blueprint for Action which Report led to an important national debate.

Authored legislation items 
 The Statutes Repeal Act, (2008)
 An Act to Amend the Federal Sustainable Development Act (2008)
 Auditor General Act (involvement of Parliament) (2010)

Sponsored legislation items 
 Canada National Parks Act (2000)
 Canada National Marine Conservation Act (2001)
 Act to Establish the Department of Public Safety and Emergency Preparedness (2005)
 Act to Amend the Migratory Birds Convention (1994)
 Species At Risk Act (2002)
 Canadian Environmental Protection Act 1999 (2005)
 Canada Border Services Agency Act (2005)
 Act to Amend the Criminal Code (justification for detention in custody) (2010)

Death 

Banks died of leukemia on January 25, 2018, in Edmonton, Alberta.

Titles, honours,  and awards.

Titles 
 December 17, 1936April 7, 2000: Mr Thomas Benjamin Banks
 April 7, 2000: The Honourable Thomas Benjamin Banks
As a former senator, Banks was entitled to be styled The Honourable for life.

Honours 

In order, these ribbons symbolise Banks': Order of Canada, Alberta Order of Excellence, Queen Elizabeth II Golden Jubilee Medal, 125th Anniversary of the Confederation of Canada Medal, Queen Elizabeth II Diamond Jubilee Medal, Alberta Centennial Medal

Awards
Banks won the Sir Frederick Haultain Prize, the 1979 Juno Award for Best Jazz Album, the 1992 Gemini Award for Best Performance in a Variety Program (with k.d. Lang, for their performance at the Canadian Country Music Awards).

Banks received an ACTRA Lifetime Achievement Award, as well as an Alberta Recording Industry Award of Distinction  and the 2010 SOCAN Special Achievement Award. His wife Ida and he were honorary co-chairs for Northern Alberta of the CKUA Radio Network Capital Campaign, and board members of Wellspring Edmonton.

1979 Juno Award - Best Jazz album: Jazz Canada Montreux 1978 (Tommy Banks Big Band with Guest Big Miller)

References

External links

 
 
 Entry at thecanadianencyclopedia.ca

1936 births
2018 deaths
Canadian senators from Alberta
Canadian people of British descent
Liberal Party of Canada senators
Members of the Alberta Order of Excellence
Officers of the Order of Canada
Musicians from Calgary
Musicians from Edmonton
Canadian jazz pianists
Politicians from Calgary
Politicians from Edmonton
Juno Award for Best Jazz Album winners
21st-century Canadian politicians
Deaths from leukemia
Deaths from cancer in Alberta